Chakchohdo is a village located in the district Sialkot of the Punjab province of Pakistan. Chakchohdo is a small village of about 500 households with a population of 1000–3000.

References

Villages in Sialkot District